Sisyphus is a 1974 Hungarian animated short film directed by Marcell Jankovics.

Summary
It is based on the myth of Sisyphus and shows a man who tries to move a boulder up a slope.

Reception and legacy
The film was nominated for the Academy Award for Best Animated Short Film at the 48th Academy Awards. In 2008, it was used in a commercial for the GMC Yukon Hybrid which was shown at the Super Bowl.

References

1970s animated short films
1974 animated films
1974 films
Animated films based on classical mythology
Films directed by Marcell Jankovics
Hungarian animated short films